Repulsive guidance molecules (RGMs) are members of a three gene family (in vertebrates) composed of RGMa, RGMb, and RGMc (also called hemojuvelin).
RGMa has been implicated to play an important role in the developing brain and in the scar tissue that forms after a brain injury. For example, RGMa helps guide retinal ganglion cell (RGC) axons to the tectum in the midbrain. It has also been demonstrated that after induced spinal cord injury RGMa accumulates in the scar tissue around the lesion. Further research has shown that RGMa is an inhibitor of axonal outgrowth. Taken together, these findings highlight the importance of RGMa in axonal guidance and outgrowth.

Family members

References 

Proteins
Developmental biology